Doryichthys heterosoma is a species of freshwater fish of the family Syngnathidae. It is only known from four specimens, which were collected from the Sambas River in West Kalimantan and the Natuna Islands in 1851. It is thought to be endemic to these locations, feeding on small crustaceans and insect larvae, where it can attain a maximum length of at least . This species is ovoviviparous, with males carrying eggs and giving birth to live young.

References

Further reading

ITIS Report

heterosoma
Marine fish
Fish described in 1851